The St Luke Passion (full title: Passio et mors Domini nostri Jesu Christi secundum Lucam, or the Passion and Death of Our Lord Jesus Christ According to St Luke) is a work for chorus and orchestra written in 1966 by Polish composer Krzysztof Penderecki, which, considered within the context of the officially atheistic Polish People's Republic and other Eastern Bloc countries, makes its potentially subversive subject matter even that much more remarkable. Penderecki wrote the work to commemorate a millennium of Polish Christianity following the baptism and conversion of Polish duke Mieszko I in 966 AD. Penderecki's setting is one of several musical settings of the Passion story and contains text from the Gospel of Luke as well as other sources such as the Stabat Mater. Despite the Passion's almost total atonality and use of avant-garde musical techniques, the musical public appreciated the work's stark power and direct emotional impact and the piece was performed several more times soon after its premiere on 30 March 1966.

Musical content

Compositional techniques
The Passion is almost entirely atonal, except for two major triads which occur once at the end of the Stabat Mater, a cappella, and once, an E-major triad, at the very end of the work with full choruses, orchestra and organ. It makes very frequent use of tone clusters, often played fortissimo by brass or organ. The contrapuntal equivalent of tone clusters is micropolyphony, which is one approach to texture that occurs in this piece .

Occasionally, Penderecki employs twelve-tone serialism, and utilizes the B-A-C-H motif. Moreover, David Wordsworth believe that the B-A-C-H motif unites the entire work . The principle tone row, Cantus Firmus I, is C–D–F–E–E–F–G–G–B–B–A–C. The tone row of Cantus Firmus II is E–E–F–F–D–C–G–A–B–A–C–B. The chorus makes use of many extended techniques, including shouting, speaking, giggling and hissing.

Orchestration
The St Luke Passion is scored for large forces: a narrator (who acts as the Evangelist); soprano, baritone and bass soloists (with the baritone singing the role of Christ and the soprano and bass taking other roles as necessary); three mixed choruses and a boys' choir; and a large orchestra consisting of:

Woodwinds
4 flutes (2 doubling piccolos, 1 doubling alto flute)
1 bass clarinet in B
2 alto saxophones
3 bassoons
1 contrabassoon

Brass
6 horns in F
4 trumpets in B
4 trombones
1 tuba

Percussion
timpani (4 drums)

bass drum
6 tom-toms
2 bongos
snare drum
whip
4 wood blocks
raganella
güiro
claves
4 cymbals
2 tam-tams
2 gongs
tubular bells

vibraphone

Keyboards
piano
organ
harmonium

Strings
harp

24 violin I's
24 violin II's
10 violas
10 violoncellos
8 double basses

Text
The text of the St Luke Passion is entirely in Latin. The primary source of the text is the Gospel of Luke; however, it contains other sources such as hymns, Psalms and Lamentations.

Sections of text
The Passion is divided into two parts and twenty-seven sections, thirteen in Part I and fourteen in Part II. Their titles are as follows.

Part I
 O Crux Ave ("O Holy Cross," from the hymn Vexilla Regis prodeunt), chorus and orchestra
 Et egressus ibat ("And he went out," Garden of Gethsemane), narrator, baritone and orchestra
 Deus Meus ("My God," Christ's prayer at Gethsemane, from Psalm 21), baritone, chorus and orchestra
 Domine, quis habitat ("Lord, who shall dwell...", from Psalms 14, 4 and 15), soprano and orchestra
 Adhuc eo loquente ("And yet while he spake," Judas's betrayal of Christ), narrator, baritone, chorus and orchestra
 Ierusalem ("Jerusalem," from the Lamentation of Jeremiah), chorus and orchestra
 Ut quid, Domine ("Why, Lord," from Psalm 9), chorus a cappella
 Comprehendentes autem eum ("Then they took him," Peter's denial of Christ), narrator, soprano, bass, chorus and orchestra
 Iudica me, Deus ("Give sentence with me, O God," from Psalm 42), bass and orchestra
 Et viri, qui tenebant illum ("And the men that held Jesus...," mocking of Christ), narrator, baritone, chorus and orchestra
 Ierusalem (text identical to section 6)
 Miserere mei, Deus ("Be merciful to me, O God," from Psalm 55), chorus a cappella
 Et surgens omnis ("And the multitude arose...," Christ's trial before Pilate and death sentence), narrator, baritone, bass, chorus and orchestra

Part II
 Et in pulverem ("And into the dust," from Psalm 21), chorus and orchestra
 Et baiulans sibi crucem ("And bearing his cross," the road to Calvary), narrator and orchestra
 Popule meus ("My people," from the Improperia), chorus and orchestra
 Ibi crucifixerunt eum ("There they crucified him," the crucifixtion of Christ), narrator and orchestra
 Crux fidelis ("O faithful cross," from Pange lingua gloriosi proelium certaminis), soprano, chorus and orchestra
 Iesus autem dicebat ("Then said Jesus," Christ's forgiveness), narrator, baritone and orchestra
 In pulverem mortis ("Into the dust of death," from Psalm 21), chorus a cappella
 Et stabat populus ("And the people stood," Christ's mocking on the cross), narrator, chorus and orchestra
 Unus autem ("And one of them...," the good and bad thieves), narrator, baritone, bass, chorus and orchestra
 Stabant autem iuxta crucem ("Now there stood by the cross," Jesus addressing his mother and John, from the Gospel of John), narrator, baritone and orchestra
 Stabat Mater ("The mother stood...," from the Stabat Mater sequence), chorus a cappella
 Erat autem fere hora sexta ("And it was about the sixth hour," Christ's death account from both Luke and John), narrator, baritone, chorus and orchestra
 Alla breve (a tempo marking in Italian indicating a quick duple meter), orchestra alone
 In pulverem mortis... In te, Domine, speravi ("Into the dust of death...In thee, O Lord, I have put my trust" from Psalm 30), soprano, baritone, bass, chorus and orchestra

References

Further reading
 Robinson, Ray, and Allen Winold. 1983. A Study of the Penderecki St. Luke Passion. Edition Moeck 4026. Celle: Moeck. .

1966 compositions
Compositions by Krzysztof Penderecki
Compositions that use extended techniques
Compositions with a narrator
Penderecki
Twelve-tone compositions